Mikel Rueda Sasieta (Bilbao, Spain ) is a film director and screenwriter.

He is a graduate in audiovisual communication with a specialty in script from the University of Navarra. He worked as a producer in Euskal Telebista (EITB) for four years and, after working on several short films, he received a scholarship to study at the New York Film Academy, where he did his post-graduate work in Film Direction.

Career
Mikel Rueda made his film debut as both a director and a writer in 2007 with the release of his short film, Presente Perfecto. His first feature length film, Izarren argia was released in 2010 at the San Sebastian International Film Festival. He filmed his first full length documentary, Quinta Plata, in New York in 2016.

Many of his films and short films contain themes surrounding themes of the gay and queer community as he believes there is still a lot for the community to claim

He has directed films in English, Spanish, and Basque.

Filmography 
 El doble más quince (Pre-Production 2018)
 Nueva York. Quinta planta (2016)
 A escondidas (2014)
 Agua! (2012)
 Izarren argia (2010)
 Cuando Corres (2010)
 Presente Perfecto (2007)

Awards and nominations

References 

1980 births
Living people
People from Bilbao
Film directors from the Basque Country (autonomous community)
University of Navarra alumni
Spanish film directors
Basque-language writers